Bindon is an historic manor in the parish of Axmouth in Devon, England.

History
It was acquired from Nicholas Bach by Roger Wyke (died c. 1467) (alias Wykes, Wycke, Wick, Wicks, Weeke, etc.)  a Member of Parliament for Plympton Erle (UK Parliament constituency) in 1413, a younger son of William Wyke of North Wyke in the parish of South Tawton in Devon. 
On 16 July 1425 he was licensed by Edmund Lacey, Bishop of Exeter to "have a chapel within his Manor House of Bindon, in the Parish of Axmouth," as is stated in the Episcopal register. Roger's great-grandson Richard Wyke died without male progeny, leaving four daughters and co-heiresses. The youngest of these was Mary Wyke who married Walter Erle (died 1581) of Colcombe in the parish of Colyton in Devon, an officer of the Privy Chamber to two wives of King Henry VIII, to his son King Edward VI and to the latter's sisters Queen Mary I and Queen Elizabeth I. Erle purchased the manor of Axmouth following the Dissolution of Syon Monastery of which it had been a possession. Thus Bindon passed to the Erle family, with other former Wyke lands including Charborough in Dorset. After four further generations in the Erle family eventually it passed by a series of heiresses to the Drax family which sold it.

Sources
Hamilton Rogers, William Henry, Memorials of the West, Historical and Descriptive, Collected on the Borderland of Somerset, Dorset and Devon, Exeter, 1888, pp. 375–82, Axmouth and Bindon
Pole, Sir William (died 1635), Collections Towards a Description of the County of Devon, Sir John-William de la Pole (ed.), London, 1791, p. 124, Bindon
Risdon, Tristram (died 1640), Survey of Devon, 1811 edition, London, 1811, with 1810 Additions, p. 26
Pevsner, Nikolaus & Cherry, Bridget, The Buildings of England: Devon, London, 2004, p. 181

References

Former manors in Devon